The 2022–23 season is NK Istra 1961 62nd season in existence and the club's 14th consecutive season in the top flight of Croatian football. In addition to the domestic league, Istra 1961 will participate in this season's edition of the Croatian Cup. The season covers the period from 1 July 2021 to 30 June 2022.

First-team squad

Transfers

In

Source: Glasilo Hrvatskog nogometnog saveza

Out

Source: Glasilo Hrvatskog nogometnog saveza

Total spending:  0 €

Total income:  250,000 €

Total expenditure:  250,000 €

Competitions

Overview

SuperSport HNL

League table

Results summary

Results by round

Matches

Croatian Football Cup

Player seasonal records
Updated 19 March 2023

Goals

Source: Competitive matches

Clean sheets

Source: Competitive matches

Disciplinary record

Appearances and goals

Notes

References

External links

NK Istra 1961 seasons
Istra 1961